The Swiss Civilian Service is a Swiss institution, created in 1996 as an civilian substitute service to military service. It was introduced as part of the so-called Vision 95 (Armeeleitbild 95) reform package. Anyone who is unable to do compulsory military service for reasons of conscience can submit an application to perform civilian service instead. Formerly, the applicant was then forced to attend a hearing where they had to explain their reasons for refusal. Now, they must take part in a one-day introductory session to civilian service within three months of submitting their application.

If one is unfit to serve in the military because of physical or psychological impairments, he is also deemed unfit for civilian service, even if the impairments do not render the individual unable to fulfill a specific task related to the civilian service. This is true, for example, for a disabled person in a wheelchair who is perfectly able to work in the administration of a nursing home. Unless they have very severe handicaps such as mental illness, men are excused or declared unfit to serve in the military are forced to pay a substitute fee of about 3 percent of their yearly income until the age of 37, when military servicemen are normally released from further service. Women are also allowed to serve in the civilian service or in the armed forces except in combat missions. Women serve voluntarily.

In 2005, the Swiss Federal Assembly began to discuss if the "state of conscience hearings" should be abolished and if the willingness to serve a longer time (see below) should be the only criterion, citing the large administrative costs for judging the cases of just a few thousand applicants per year. The high rate of young people opting to serve in the alternative service has also created organizational problems. On the other hand, the civilian service option under the Vision 95 reform package has increased the rate of approval of the public, particularly the young segment of the population, for the existence of the Swiss armed forces.

Civilian service 
Once part of the civilian service program, one has to work 50 percent longer than the total normal cumulative  military service period. Full cumulative military service for normal soldiers is currently 245 days, while full civilian service is 365 days. Many nonprofit organizations are licensed to employ civilian service workers. Unlike the former Civilian Service in Germany, where the servants did their work mainly in hospitals and healthcare sites, Swiss ones can apply for work in a broad variety of opportunities: health care, welfare, environmental protection, agriculture (small or alpine farms), research projects, and development assistance abroad.

Civilian servicemen must have the appropriate skills for each type of assignment – for example, because there are very few job vacancies in development aid.

A big difference between civilian and military service is that civilian service participants can greatly profit from his substitute service – in terms of work experience – to achieve a better position after the service, although it is formally not allowed to do civilian service with, for example, the goal of passing an exam in mind. So, during civilian service in a research institute, one must not write personal academic papers to be submitted at a later time.

There are still issues with how to handle Swiss living abroad who have already passed recruitment and are already members of the Swiss militia army. In this case, they are not exempt from military service or civilian service, and every step of the application process requires their presence in Switzerland.

See also
Pacifism
Civilian service
Zivildienst

References

External links
Vollzugsstelle für den Zivildienst ZIVI, official Swiss government website 
Beratungsstelle für Zivildienst und Militärverweigerung, association offering assistance for those seeking to enter the Swiss Civilian Service or bypass conscription 
Gemeinschaft Schweizer Zivildienstleistender, association for promotion of Swiss Civilian Service 

Civil Service
Federal Department of Defence, Civil Protection and Sports
Civil Service
Conscientious objection